Quinzaine is a word of French language derivation: 'a quinzaine' is to Fifteen as 'a dozen' is to Twelve, and 'a trental' is to Thirty. It has various contexts of use in English.
'La quinzaine' is used in French to indicate a two week period, just like 'huit jours' indicates a one week period (in France) even though two weeks are fourteen days and one week is 7 days. It is an old habit to add the current day as to say 'in two weeks plus today'. The English language equivalent is 'fortnight' which means fourteen days.

Quinzaine (poetic form)
A Quinzaine is an unrhymed verse of fifteen syllables. The word comes from the French word quinze, meaning fifteen. The syllables are distributed over three lines so that there are seven syllables in the first line, five in the second line, and three in the third line (7/5/3). The first line makes a statement. The next two lines ask a question relating to that statement.

Examples
I would like to drive my car
Can you drive a car? 
Are you fast?

I'm a Wikipedian.
Why do I do it?
Anyone?

Quinzaine (date calculation)
Quinzaine is a term used in the medieval and ecclesiastical calculation of a date, working from a given Feast day of the Calendar. The quinzaine of a feast is a day fifteen days after the feast, counting both the day of the feast itself and the day calculated. It is a variant of the term Quindene: it is used in the same way that Octave is used to signify eight days (one week, counting in the initial feast).

Example
'The quinzaine of the Nativity of St John the Baptist.'

The Nativity of St. John the Baptist is 24 June. 
June has 30 days: the quinzaine is therefore 8 July.

Parliamentary
In England the Quinzaine was used to refer to a period during which parliament met according to a Writ of Summons by the King.  A specific example would be 1257 parliamentum for which the Rolls were latterly destroyed, probably by fire in the 19th or 20th century.  Its significance lay in the Charters used to confirm parliament's right to sit and be summoned at a specific date.  Parliamntum or parliamentum generalissimum could be called every quarter, that coincided with Hilary, Easter, Trinity and Michaelmas terms, which also happened to be the legal terms for the Inns of Courts in Westminster and London.  The quaint term of quindene was also used.

References

Poetic forms
Word play